Mochoʼ or Motozintleco is a moribund Mayan language spoken by the Motozintleco people of Chiapas, Mexico. It is part of the western branch of Mayan languages. Mochoʼ speakers refer to their own language as qatô:k (spelled "Cotoque" in some older sources), which means 'our language'. Mochoʼ has a dialect called Tuzantec spoken in Tuzantan, Chiapas.

Mochoʼ is considered a moribund language, with fewer than 30 currently recorded speakers, and no focus on passing down the language to children. Most speakers are bilingual in modern Spanish, which is effectively displacing the Mochoʼ language in southern Mexico.

Demographics
Mocho is a moribund language with less than 30 fluent speakers as of 2011. All speakers are over the age of 70. As of 2009, there are fewer than 5 speakers of Tuzanteco, a closely related language variety.

The two dialects of Mochoʼ are spoken in two different villages: the Tuzantec dialect in Tuzantán (a town near Huixtla, Chiapas), and the Motozintlec dialect in Motozintla de Mendoza. Historically, the two groups descend from a single population living in the region of Belisario Dominguez about 500 years ago. According to local legend, the split and migration was caused by a plague of bats. Speakers have also been reported in the nearby towns of Tolimán, Buenos Aires, and Campana. Palosaari (2011) describes the Motozintlec dialect.

Phonology
Unlike most Mayan languages, Mochoʼ is tonal. Stress is regular and at the last syllable.

Short vowels have level or rising pitch.
Long vowels have tonal contrast, with falling pitch found only in stressed syllables. Stressed plain long vowels have a rising pitch or a level high pitch.

In Mochoʼ, Proto-Mayan *j [x] and *h [h] have merged to /j/ in Motozintleco, while Tuzanteco preserves this distinction. Tuzanteco, however, has lost vowel length.

It is worth noting that pronunciation rules change compared to modern Spanish, as ñ becomes an "ng" sound like in sing, and glottalization becomes important for many consonants.

Orthography

All Orthographical information below is sourced directly from the Native Languages of the Americas website. Included are the standard characters for each alphabetical sound, as well as replacement symbols used in varying scholarly texts.

References

Further reading
Kaufman, T. (1969). Preliminary Mochoʼ vocabulary (Working Paper 5). Berkeley, CA: University of California.
Campbell, L. (1988). The linguistics of southeast Chiapas, Mexico (Vol. 50). Provo, UT: Brigham Young University Press.
Martin, L. (1998). Irrealis constructions in Mochoʼ (Mayan). Anthropological Linguistics (2), 198-213.
Martin, L. (1987). The interdependence of language and culture in the bear story in Spanish and Mocho. Anthropological Linguistics (4), 533-548.
England, N. C., & Maldonado, R. Z. (2013). Mayan languages. Oxford University Press.
Schuman, Otto. 1969. "El tuzanteco y su posición dentro de la familia mayense" en Anales del Instituto Nacional de Antropología e Historia. México. pp. 139–148.

External links
Mayan Languages Collection of Laura Martin. Archive of the Indigenous Languages of Latin America. [Audio recordings, transcriptions, translations, and field notes on Mocho' and other Mayan languages. Free registration required.]
MesoAmerican Languages Collection of Lyle Campbell. Archive of the Indigenous Languages of Latin America. [Audio recordings, transcriptions, and translations of several languages including Mocho'. Free registration required.]

Articles in class projects/Rutgers
Agglutinative languages
Tonal languages
Indigenous languages of Mexico
Mayan languages
Mesoamerican languages
Endangered indigenous languages of the Americas